The 7th National Film Awards, then known as State Awards for Films, presented by Ministry of Information and Broadcasting, India to felicitate the best of Indian Cinema released in the year 1959. Ceremony took place at Vigyan Bhavan, New Delhi on 1 May 1960 and awards were given by then Vice-President of India, Dr. Sarvepalli Radhakrishnan.

Awards 

Awards were divided into feature films and non-feature films.

President's Gold Medal for the All India Best Feature Film is now better known as National Film Award for Best Feature Film, whereas President's Gold Medal for the Best Documentary Film is analogous to today's National Film Award for Best Non-Feature Film. For children's films, Prime Minister's Gold Medal is now given as National Film Award for Best Children's Film. At the regional level, President's Silver Medal for Best Feature Film is now given as National Film Award for Best Feature Film in a particular language. Certificate of Merit in all the categories is discontinued over the years.

Feature films 

Feature films were awarded at All India as well as regional level. For the 7th National Film Awards, a Bengali film Apur Sansar won the President's Gold Medal for the All India Best Feature Film. Following were the awards given:

All India Award 

For 7th National Film awards, none of the films were awarded from Documentary and Children's Films category as no film was found to be suitable, instead only Certificate of Merit was given. Following were the awards given in each category:

Regional Award 

The awards were given to the best films made in the regional languages of India. For 7th National Film Awards, President's Silver Medal for Best Feature Film was not given in Bengali, Kannada and Malayalam language; instead Certificate of Merit was awarded in each particular language.

Non-Feature films 

Non-feature film awards were given for the documentaries made in the country. Following were the awards given:

Documentaries

Awards not given 

Following were the awards not given as no film was found to be suitable for the award:

 President's Gold Medal for the Best Documentary Film
 Prime Minister's Gold Medal for the Best Children's Film
 President's Silver Medal for Best Feature Film in Bengali
 President's Silver Medal for Best Feature Film in Kannada
 President's Silver Medal for Best Feature Film in Malayalam
 President's Silver Medal for Best Feature Film in Marathi

References

External links 
 National Film Awards Archives
 Official Page for Directorate of Film Festivals, India

National Film Awards (India) ceremonies
1960 in Indian cinema
1960 film awards